Larentiini is a tribe of geometer moths under subfamily Larentiinae. The tribe was first described by Philogène Auguste Joseph Duponchel in 1845.

Recognized genera
 Anticlea Stephens, 1831
 Antilurga Herbulot, 1951
 Earophila Gumppenberg, 1887
 Ennada Blanchard, 1852
 Entephria Hübner, 1825
 Herbulotina Pinker, [1971]
 Idiotephria Inoue, 1943
 Kuldscha Alphéraky, 1883
 Kyrtolitha Staudinger, 1892
 Larentia Treitschke, 1825
 Mesoleuca Hübner, 1825
 Neotephria Prout, 1914
 Pelurga Hübner, 1825
 Photoscotosia Warren, 1888
 Plesioscotosia Viidalepp, 1986
 Pseudentephria Viidalepp, 1976
 Spargania Guenée, 1857

References

External links

 
Larentiinae